Elves is a supplement for fantasy role-playing games published by Mayfair Games in 1983.

Contents
Elves is a supplement describing elven characters and the various elven cultures, history, and gods.  With six scenarios for elf characters, levels 4-7, one for each type of elf: wood elves, grey elves, dark elves, high elves, etc.

Publication history
Elves was written by Cheron Fitzgerald Carr and Delbert Carr, Jr., with Daniel Greenberg, Anne Jaffe, and Sam Shirley, with a cover by Janny Wurts, and was published by Mayfair Games in 1983 as a 96-page book.  A second printing was published in 1985.

After the publication of Dwarves, the fourth Role Aids supplement, according to Shannon Appelcline, Mayfair Games "published additional AD&D Role Aids supplements quickly and in volume. The line featured many adventures as well as an increasing number of source books, including race- and class-related books like Dark Folk (1983), Wizards (1983) and Elves (1983). Each product proudly proclaimed its use with AD&D, though the disclaimer was soon moved to the back cover."

Reception
Robert Dale reviewed Elves for White Dwarf #57, giving the book a rating of 3 out of 10 overall.  He called Elves "execrable, excruciating and extortionate", stating that "the price should dissuade any self-respecting gamer" from buying it.  He felt that the purpose of the book, to aid roleplaying, is negated by the pseudo-scientific style in which the material is presented.  He found that the adventures in the book were not specifically designed for elves. Dale concluded that Elves was a "merely amateur" rehashing of "widely current material lacking the redeeming features of a coherent setting or adequate presentation."

References

Elves in popular culture
Fantasy role-playing game supplements
Role Aids
Role-playing game supplements introduced in 1983